Bangaru Babu is a 1973 Indian Telugu-language romance film, produced and directed by V. B. Rajendra Prasad. It stars Akkineni Nageswara Rao and Vanisri, with music composed by K. V. Mahadevan. The film was a box office hit.

Plot 
In a remote area, Buchi Babu (Akkineni Nageswara Rao) a well-respected person, works as a railway station master. Vani (Vanisri) is a budding actress who got fame and riches in a short span. Jagannatham (Nagabhushanam), her maternal uncle, a vicious person, plots to marry her to usurp the wealth. Being cognizant of it, Vani escapes while traveling for an outdoor shooting and lands at Buchi Babu's residence. Kind-hearted Buchi Babu gives her shelter for one night, but unfortunately, people assume her as his wife. So, to keep up honor he continues the drama, after some time, they truly fall in love. At present, Buchi Babu moves to his father Raghavaiah (S. V. Ranga Rao) for the approval of his marriage. By that time, Raghavaiah fixes an alliance for his blind daughter Chandra (Jayanthi), where the bridegroom makes a condition that Buchi Babu should marry his sister. Buchi Babu refuses and annoyed Raghavaiah throws him out. After return, he finds the reality of Vani through Jaganatham, could not bear the betrayal and sends her away. Devastated, Buchi Babu resigns his job and gets back to his father. Heretofore, Raghavaiah is terminally ill when Buchi Babu promises to recoup Chandra's eyesight and perform her marriage. Now, he shifts to the city and works hard to acquire the amount required for the surgery. Meanwhile, Vani decides to quickly finish off her assignments and go back to Buchi Babu. Here, Vani tries to come closer to Buchi Babu several times, but he loathes her. Meanwhile, Vani's brother Dr. Ram Mohan (Jaggayya) is an eye specialist, Buchi Babu takes Chandra to him for consultation when he understands the virtue of Vani. At that point in time, malicious Jaganatham intrigues to eliminate Vani during the shooting as an accident. Knowing it, Buchi Babu rescues her and stops Jaganatham. At last, Chandra recovers eyesight when Ram Mohan decides to marry her. Finally, the movie ends a happy note with the marriage of Buchi Babu and Vani.

Cast 

Akkineni Nageswara Rao as Buchi Babu
Vanisri as Vani
S. V. Ranga Rao as Raghavaiah
Jaggayya as Dr. Ram Mohan
Gummadi as Ranganatham
Nagabhushanam as Jaganatham
Ramana Reddy as Director
Padmanabham as Producer Seshaiah
Satyanarayana as himself
Rajababu as Hanumanthu
K. V. Chalam as Madhu
Sakshi Ranga Rao as Seshaiah
Sarathi as Manager
Suryakantham as Savitri
S. Varalakshmi as Vani's aunt
Jayanthi as Chandra
Ramaprabha as Manikyam
Vijaya Bhanu as Bharathi

Special appearances
Krishna
Sobhan Babu
Sivaji Ganesan
Rajesh Khanna

Soundtrack 

Music composed by K. V. Mahadevan. Lyrics were written by Acharya Aatreya.

References

External links 

1970s Telugu-language films
1973 films
Films directed by V. B. Rajendra Prasad
Films scored by K. V. Mahadevan